Spadina was a Canadian electoral district that was represented in the House of Commons of Canada from 1935 to 1988. It covered a portion of the western-central Toronto, Ontario.  Its name comes from the Spadina Avenue, which runs through the heart of the riding.

It was formed in 1933 from portions of Toronto Northeast, Toronto Northwest, Toronto West Centre, and Toronto South.  Its boundaries changed repeatedly over the years, when it created it stretched far north to the edge of the city boundaries.  As this northern portion of became more populated it was split off into other ridings.  Its eastern and western boundaries were more consistent, with it stretching from John Street in the east to Bathurst Street in the west.  In 1987, due to the relative decrease in the population of downtown Toronto compared to other areas, it was merged with Trinity to form Trinity—Spadina.  Some portions also went to the eastern riding of Rosedale.

Members of Parliament

This riding has elected the following Members of Parliament:

Election results

References

Former federal electoral districts of Ontario
Federal electoral districts of Toronto